Kafrish (also spelled Kafr Rish) is a village in northern Syria located northwest of Homs in the Homs Governorate. According to the Syria Central Bureau of Statistics, Kafrish had a population of 654 in the 2004 census. Its inhabitants are predominantly Alawites.

References

Bibliography

 

Populated places in Talkalakh District
Alawite communities in Syria